William Ernest Newnham Scott (31 May 1903 – 6 August 1989) was an English first-class cricketer. Scott was a right-handed batsman who bowled right-arm off break.

Scott had been invited by Hampshire for a trial in 1925. A hand injury prevented him from playing for the county that season.

Instead Scott made his first-class debut for Hampshire against Essex. Scott made five appearances for Hampshire during the 1927 County Championship, with his final first-class match for the county coming against Nottinghamshire at Trent Bridge.

Scott died at Newport on the Isle of Wight on 6 August 1989. At the time of his death, Scott was the only man born on the island to play first-class cricket.

References

External links
William Scott at Cricinfo
William Scott at CricketArchive

1903 births
1989 deaths
Sportspeople from the Isle of Wight
English cricketers
Hampshire cricketers